Harold Wade Phillips (born June 21, 1947) is an American football coach who is currently the head coach of the Houston Roughnecks of the XFL. He has served as head coach of the Denver Broncos, Buffalo Bills, and Dallas Cowboys. He has also served as interim head coach for the New Orleans Saints, Atlanta Falcons, and the Houston Texans. His career winning percentage as a head coach is .546. Additionally, Phillips has long been considered to be among the best defensive coordinators in the NFL. In his long career, he has served as defensive coordinator in eight separate stints with seven different franchises (twice with the Denver Broncos). Multiple players under Phillips' system have won Defensive Player of the Year: Reggie White, Bryce Paup, Bruce Smith, J. J. Watt and Aaron Donald. Others under Phillips have won Defensive Rookie of the Year: Mike Croel and Shawne Merriman.

Early career
Phillips attended Port Neches–Groves High School in Port Neches, Texas, and went to the University of Houston, where he was a three-year starter at linebacker from 1966 to 1968. He held the school record for career assisted tackles (228) until 2011 when the record was broken by Marcus McGraw.

Phillips began his coaching career as a graduate assistant to Bill Yeoman at the University of Houston in 1969. From 1970 to 1972 he served as defensive coordinator at the former Lutcher Stark High School (now West Orange-Stark High School) in Orange, Texas. He then coached the linebackers at Oklahoma State University from 1973 to 1974, under his father, Bum Phillips, who was OSU defensive coordinator at that time. In 1975, Phillips coached the defensive line at the University of Kansas under head coach Bud Moore.

NFL coaching
Phillips began his professional coaching career with the Houston Oilers, head-coached by his father. He served as the linebackers coach in 1976, and the defensive line coach from 1977 to 1980.

Wade remained on his father's staff as the pair headed for New Orleans. Bum stepped down as head coach of a struggling Saints team in late 1985, and Wade stepped in as interim head coach. The Saints routed the eventual NFC West champion Los Angeles Rams 29–3 in his first game at the helm, but finished with losses to the Cardinals, 49ers and Falcons. Phillips was interviewed for the job permanently in January 1986 by new Saints president and general manager Jim Finks, but the position went to Jim Mora, the highly successful coach of the United States Football League's Philadelphia/Baltimore Stars.

Wade spent the next three years as the defensive coordinator of the Philadelphia Eagles under Buddy Ryan. During Phillips' tenure in Philadelphia, defensive end Reggie White recorded 21 sacks in just 12 games in 1987, and the Eagles won the NFC East championship in 1988. Phillips' last game with the Eagles was the infamous Fog Bowl vs. the Chicago Bears in the NFC divisional playoffs.

Denver Broncos
Phillips then spent four seasons as the defensive coordinator for the Denver Broncos. The Broncos reached Super Bowl XXIV, where they lost to the San Francisco 49ers, 55–10. Phillips replaced Dan Reeves as head coach for the Broncos in 1993, but was fired after a mediocre 1994 season in which management felt he lost control of the team.

Buffalo Bills
Phillips spent two seasons as the Buffalo Bills defensive coordinator under Hall of Fame coach Marv Levy. After Levy's retirement in 1998, the Bills hired Phillips as head coach. Phillips enjoyed a successful coaching stop at Buffalo. He always kept the team competitive and in the playoff hunt. A loss to the Titans in the 1999 playoffs haunted Phillips for the rest of his time at Buffalo. Prior to the game, Phillips made the controversial decision to start Rob Johnson at quarterback, after Doug Flutie was the starter the whole year and led the team to the playoffs. Following an 8–8 record in 2000, owner Ralph Wilson fired Phillips after Phillips refused to fire special teams coach Ronnie Jones.

Dallas Cowboys
On February 8, 2007, Phillips was named the head coach of the Dallas Cowboys, replacing the retired Bill Parcells. This was the most successful coaching stop for Phillips. He was chosen after Jerry Jones interviewed 10 potential replacements, including former Cowboys and former San Francisco 49ers offensive coordinator Norv Turner, former Chicago Bears defensive coordinator Ron Rivera and former Cowboys quarterback Jason Garrett. In the 2007 NFL playoffs, he led the Cowboys to another playoff loss, making his playoff record 0–4. The Cowboys failed to make the playoffs in 2008, as the season ended with a 44–6 loss to the Philadelphia Eagles, preventing a wild card playoff berth.

Prior to the 2009 season, Phillips also took over as defensive coordinator, replacing the fired Brian Stewart. Phillips called defensive plays for the final 10 games of the 2008 season after Stewart was stripped of the responsibilities. On January 9, 2010, in the 2009–10 playoffs, Phillips' Cowboys defeated the Eagles in the wild card round, ending the club's 12-year playoff win drought (6 games total, Phillips was only coach for one of those losses) and earning Phillips his first playoff win. Following the 2009 season, Phillips signed a contract extension through the 2011 season. However, he was fired by the Cowboys on November 8, 2010, following the second-worst start in franchise history (one win in their first eight games) punctuated by a 45–7 loss to the Green Bay Packers. Garrett was named interim coach, then permanent successor, and held the position through 2019.

Houston Texans
On January 5, 2011, Phillips was hired as the defensive coordinator of the Houston Texans, replacing Frank Bush, who was released by Texans owner Bob McNair. The Texans defense made major improvements on defense in Phillips' first year calling Houston's defense. Houston allowed the fourth-fewest points in the league in 2011 (compared to fourth-most in 2010), the second-fewest yards allowed (third-most in 2010) and third-fewest yards per play (4.8, compared to 6.0, second-worst in 2010). On November 3, 2013, Texans head coach Gary Kubiak collapsed at the end of the first half of the Texans-Colts game; he was then hospitalized at a local hospital. In Kubiak's absence, Phillips was given the head coaching duties as the acting head coach for the remainder of the game. On November 6, 2013, the Texans and Kubiak decided to temporarily hand Phillips the head coaching duties, and named him the interim head coach until Kubiak was medically cleared to return. Exactly one month later, Kubiak was fired after his team had lost 11 games in a row.  Once again, Phillips served as interim head coach for the Texans until the end of the season, when former Penn State head coach and New England Patriots offensive coordinator Bill O'Brien was hired as the new head coach. When Phillips was dismissed by Houston, this ended a continuous run where he had coached football at the high school, college, and NFL levels.

Denver Broncos (second stint)
On January 28, 2015, Phillips reunited with Gary Kubiak, joining the latter's staff as the defensive coordinator on the Denver Broncos. It would be Phillips' second stint at that position with the team. Phillips replaced his predecessor's complex wait-and-react scheme with a simple style of going after the ball, making Denver the top-ranked defense that season, which carried the team to a 12–4 record and the number one seed in the AFC despite their offensive struggles. In Super Bowl 50, played on February 7, 2016, in Santa Clara, California, the game was seen by some as a contest between Phillips and Carolina Panthers offensive coordinator Mike Shula, as both of them were sons of well-known NFL coaches, and as Carolina had the top-ranked offense in the 2015 regular season. Denver's defense shut down Carolina and Cam Newton in a 24–10 victory, giving Phillips the first Super Bowl victory of his career.

Following the retirement of Kubiak as head coach after the 2016 season, Phillips was replaced by Joe Woods as the defensive coordinator for the Broncos.

Los Angeles Rams
After a successful stint with the Denver Broncos, Phillips left to become defensive coordinator of the Los Angeles Rams, alongside new head coach Sean McVay.

In Super Bowl LIII, Phillips' defense was credited with keeping the New England Patriots and Tom Brady out of the end zone until the fourth quarter, as the Rams only trailed by a field goal for the first three quarters despite the Patriots' offense having the majority of possession. The Patriots' offense had to resort to running the ball often, eventually tiring out the Rams defensive line. However, the Rams' top-ranked offense that game was stifled and they lost to the Patriots, 13–3.

On January 6, 2020, the Rams announced they would not be renewing his contract. This followed their 2019 season in which the Rams went 9–7 and failed to make the playoffs.

XFL 
In April 2022, Phillips was announced as a Head Coach for an XFL Team. It was later revealed in July 2022 that he would be coaching the Houston Roughnecks.

Head coaching record

Counting head coaching jobs as well as interim stints, Phillips has served as head coach for more teams (six) than any other person in NFL history.

NFL 

* Interim head coach

XFL

Personal life
Wade is the son of former NFL coach Bum Phillips and Helen Wilson Phillips. He adored his father, both personally and professionally, stating, "I was blessed to have him as a father and coach. I got to coach with him for 11 years. He taught me everything I know about coaching. He taught me right and wrong. He taught me to enjoy life."

Wade and wife Laurie met in 1964 at Port Neches–Groves High School, where he was the quarterback of the football team and she was the head cheerleader; they have a daughter, Tracy, an actress, dancer, and choreographer living in Southern California who played the title role in My Chemical Romance's video "Helena" in 2005, and a son, Wes Phillips, who served alongside his father in Dallas and in 2019 on the Rams staff.

References

External links
 Los Angeles Rams profile

1947 births
Living people
American football linebackers
Atlanta Falcons coaches
Atlanta Falcons head coaches
Buffalo Bills coaches
Buffalo Bills head coaches
Dallas Cowboys head coaches
Denver Broncos coaches
Denver Broncos head coaches
Houston Cougars football coaches
Houston Cougars football players
Houston Oilers coaches
Houston Roughnecks coaches
Houston Texans coaches
Houston Texans head coaches
Kansas Jayhawks football coaches
Los Angeles Rams coaches
National Football League defensive coordinators
New Orleans Saints coaches
New Orleans Saints head coaches
Oklahoma State Cowboys football coaches
People from Orange, Texas
Philadelphia Eagles coaches
Players of American football from Texas
San Diego Chargers coaches